The Rajasthani language movement has been campaigning for greater recognition for the Rajasthani language since 1947.

References

Linguists to march for Rajasthani from The Hindu

External links
Sahitya Akademi Website

Language conflict in India